Robert Lloyd Lewis is an American television and film producer. He has worked as a producer on the Showtime drama series Dexter since 2006 and has received multiple award nominations for his work on the series.

Career
Lewis joined the crew of Dexter as the episodic producer midway through the first season in 2006. He took over the role from Dennis Bishop. He remained in this role through the second, third, fourth and fifth seasons. For his work in the series he received Producers Guild of America PGA Award nominations as 'Television Producer of the Year' in 2008, 2009, 2010, and 2011, as well as being co-nominated for a Primetime Emmy Awards for 'Outstanding Drama Series' in 2008, 2009, 2010, and 2011.

Filmography
His television film A Summer to Remember (1985) received a Young Artist Award nomination for actress Bridgette Andersen, and his television series Related received a Young Artist Award nomination for actress Bridgette Andersen.

Television
 A Summer to Remember (1985)
 Midas Valley (1985)
 Betrayed by Innocence (1986)
 Firefighter (1986)
 Swimsuit (1989)
 Spy (1989)
 Parker Lewis Can't Lose (62 episodes, 1990–1993)
 Weird Science (1994)
 Players (1997)
 Get Real (1999)
 Action (1 episode, 1999)
 The Big House (2001) Being Brewster
 Trash (2003)
 A.U.S.A. (2003)
 Skin (2003)
 Method & Red (2004)
 Reunion (2005)
 Related episodes, 2005–2006)
 Dexter (57 episodes, 2006–2010)

Film
 Superstition (1982)
 Hamburger: The Motion Picture (1986)

Recognition

Awards and nominations
 2008, PGA Award nomination as 'Television Producer of the Year'  for Dexter
 2008, Primetime Emmy Award nomination for 'Outstanding Drama Series' for Dexter
 2009, BAFTA Award nomination for 'Best International Series' for Dexter
 2009, PGA Award nomination as 'Television Producer of the Year' for Dexter
 2009, Primetime Emmy Award nomination for 'Outstanding Drama Series' for Dexter
 2010, PGA Award nomination as 'Television Producer of the Year' for Dexter
 2010, Primetime Emmy Award nomination for 'Outstanding Drama Series' for Dexter
 2011, PGA Award nomination as 'Television Producer of the Year' for Dexter
 2011, Primetime Emmy Award nomination for 'Outstanding Drama Series' for Dexter

References

External links
 

American television producers
Living people
Place of birth missing (living people)
Year of birth missing (living people)